193 (one hundred [and] ninety-three) is the natural number following 192 and preceding 194.

In mathematics 
193 is a Pierpont prime number, implying that a 193-gon can be constructed using a compass, straightedge, and angle trisector. It is the number of compositions of 14 into distinct parts. 

It is part of the fourteenth pair of twin primes , the seventh trio of prime triplets , and the fourth set of prime quadruplets .
In decimal, it is the 17th full repetend prime, or long prime.

Aside from itself, the friendly giant, the largest sporadic group, holds a total of 193 conjugacy classes. It also holds at least 44 maximal subgroups (the forty-fourth prime number is 193).

193 is the eighth numerator of convergents to Euler's number; correct to three decimal places:   The denominator is 71, which is the largest supersingular prime that uniquely divides the order of the friendly giant.

See also
 193 (disambiguation)

References

Integers